Blantyre is one of the 20 electoral wards of South Lanarkshire Council. Created in 2007, the ward initially elected four councillors using the single transferable vote electoral system before a boundary review in 2017 reduced the number of councillors to three. It covers an area with a population of 15,968 people.

The ward is a Labour stronghold with the party holding at least two of the seats since the ward's creation. From 2014 to 2017, the party held all four seats in the ward.

Boundaries
The ward was created following the Fourth Statutory Reviews of Electoral Arrangements ahead of the 2007 Scottish local elections. As a result of the Local Governance (Scotland) Act 2004, local elections in Scotland would use the single transferable vote electoral system from 2007 onwards so Blantyre was formed from an amalgamation of several previous first-past-the-post wards. It contained part of the former Burnbank/Blantyre and High Blantyre wards as well as all of the former Blantyre West and Coatshill/Low Blantyre wards. The Blantyre ward centres on the town of Blantyre, excluding the Hamilton International Technology Park and the modern West Craigs development on the town's southern periphery, in the north of South Lanarkshire between the towns of Cambuslang and Uddingston. The ward is bounded to the north and east by the River Clyde, to the west by the Rotten Calder and to the south by the A725 East Kilbride Expressway. The ward's northern boundary also coincides with the council's border with Glasgow City Council. Following the Fifth Statutory Reviews of Electoral Arrangements ahead of the 2017 Scottish local elections, streets around Ballantrae Road were transferred into Hamilton North and East. The review resulted in a reduction in the number of seats from four to three in order to balance with other wards with similar populations.

Councillors

Election results

2022 election

2017 election

2015 by-election

2012 election

2007 election

Notes

References

Wards of South Lanarkshire
Blantyre, South Lanarkshire